Lord of Magna: Maiden Heaven is a simulation role-playing video game developed by Marvelous for the Nintendo 3DS. It was released in Japan in October 2014, and was released worldwide in June 2015 by Xseed Games.

Gameplay
The game's battle system is similar to the battle system found in Valkyria Chronicles. It features turn-based battles, with character order based on individual speed. The parties are assembled within a deck and controls in battle have been compared to those of an action game. The special attacks of the characters are unlocked based on their trust in Luchs, the game's protagonist, and by defeating enemies more special moves can be used.

Story

Development
The game was first announced in February 2014, and was about half complete at the time of its reveal. The development of the game began internally at Neverland before the closure of the studio. The game development team contains staff from Neverland, the development company responsible for the Rune Factory series of games. After the release of Rune Factory 4, Neverland had filed for bankruptcy and closed. Despite this, publisher Marvelous retained some key staff in order to finish work on the game. Key staff retained includes producer Yoshifumi Hashimoto, director Masahide Miyata, and composer Tomoko Morita. The game's graphics uses a similar style to that of the Story of Seasons and Rune Factory iterations found on the Nintendo 3DS.

The game was released in Japan on October 2, 2014, and in North America and Europe in June 2015.

Reception

Lord of Magna: Maiden Heaven holds a rating of 68/100 on review aggregate site Metacritic, indicating "mixed or average reviews".

Chris Carter from Destructoid rated the game a 7/10 saying, "I enjoyed my time with Lord of Magna: Maiden Heaven, despite the fact that it felt a tad unfinished at times" Bradly Storm of Hardcore Gamer gave the game a 3.5 out of 5 saying "Those looking for a unique take on the genre or are wanting an engaging tactical combat system might find Lord of Magna worth the investment."

Notes

References

External links

2014 video games
Fantasy video games
Marvelous (company) games
Nintendo 3DS games
Nintendo 3DS eShop games
Nintendo 3DS-only games
Role-playing video games
Romance video games
Tactical role-playing video games
Video games developed in Japan
Xseed Games games